"Chasing Summers" is an instrumental composition by Dutch disc jockey and producer Tiësto. Dutch disc jockeys and producers R3HAB and Quintino released a remix of the track on 5 March 2013 which gained more success than the original. The original version was included in Tiësto's compilation, Club Life, Vol. 2 - Miami, released on 21 April 2012. It is a homage to the summers of Miami.

Music video 
The music video of the R3HAB and Quintino Remix was premiered on Tiësto's official YouTube channel on 8 March 2013.

Track listing 
Digital download / CD (from Club Life, Vol. 2 - Miami compilation)
 "Chasing Summers" (Original Mix) - 6:36

Digital download - R3HAB and Quintino Remix (MF042)
 "Chasing Summers" (R3HAB & Quintino Remix) - 4:41

Charts

R3HAB and Quintino Remix

References

2012 songs
2013 songs
Tiësto songs
Songs written by Tiësto
R3hab songs